Inna Paliyenko  (born 8 June 1969) is a Ukrainian freestyle skier. She was born in Mykolaiv. She competed at the 1994 Winter Olympics, in women's aerials.

References

External links 
 

1969 births
Sportspeople from Mykolaiv
Living people
Ukrainian female freestyle skiers
Olympic freestyle skiers of Ukraine
Freestyle skiers at the 1994 Winter Olympics